In the ancient Mediterranean region, bugonia or bougonia was a ritual based on the belief that bees were spontaneously (equivocally) generated from a cow's carcass, although it is possible that the ritual had more currency as a poetic and learned trope than as an actual practice.

Description
A detailed description of the bugonia process can be found in Byzantine Geoponica:

Build a house, ten cubits high, with all the sides of equal dimensions, with one door, and four windows, one on each side; put an ox into it, thirty months old, very fat and fleshy; let a number of young men kill him by beating him violently with clubs, so as to mangle both flesh and bones, but taking care not to shed any blood; let all the orifices, mouth, eyes, nose etc. be stopped up with clean and fine linen, impregnated with pitch; let a quantity of thyme be strewed under the reclining animal, and then let windows and doors be closed and covered with a thick coating of clay, to prevent the access of air or wind. After three weeks have passed, let the house be opened, and let light and fresh air get access to it, except from the side from which the wind blows strongest. Eleven days afterwards, you will find the house full of bees, hanging together in clusters, and nothing left of the ox but horns, bones and hair.

The story of Aristaeus was an archetype of this ritual, serving to instruct bee keepers on how to recover from the loss of their bees. By extension, it was thought that fumigation with cow dung was beneficial to the health of the hive.

Variations
The idea that wasps are born of the corpses of horses was often described alongside bugonia. And given that European wasps bear a passing resemblance to European bees, it may be possible that the myth arose out of a mis-reported or misunderstood observation of a natural event.

Different variations are attested, such as simply burying the cow, or covering the corpse with mud or dung. Another variation states that use of the rumen alone is sufficient.

In Ancient Egypt the ox would be buried with its horns projecting above the surface of the ground. When severed, bees would emerge from the base of the horns.

Bugonia is described twice in the second half of Virgil's Georgics and frames the Aristaeus epyllion in the second half. The first description, opening the second half of the fourth book, describes a 'traditional' form of the ritual, followed by the tale of Aristaeus, who after losing his bees, descends to the home of his mother, the nymph Cyrene, where he is given instructions on how to restore his colonies. He must capture the seer, Proteus, and force him to reveal which divine spirit he angered. Proteus changes into many forms but is bound at last and recounts how he caused the death of Eurydice, thus angering the nymphs. the ritual demanded of Aristaeus by Cyrene upon his return is markedly different. He is to sacrifice four bulls, four heifers, a black sheep and a calf in an open glen. This second version served as the climax of a large work so may be based more on the traditional Roman sacrificial ritual than bugonia itself in order to close the Georgics in a more symbolically appropriate way. Thus the first version can reflect man's relation to the gods in the Golden Age and the later the current relation.

Etymology 
Bougonia comes from the Greek "βοῦς", meaning "ox"  and "γονή" meaning "progeny". Furthermore, the expressions "bugenès melissae" and "taurigenae apes" meant "oxen-born bees" and the ancient Greeks would sometimes simply call honey bees "bugenès" or "taurigenae".

Ancient attestation
Perhaps the earliest mention is by Nicander of Colophon.

The process is described by Virgil in the fourth book of the Georgics. Many other writers mention the practice.

In the Hermetic Cyranides it is reported that worms are born after one week and bees after three weeks.

Quoting Ovid's Metamorphoses (XV.361–68), Florentinus of the Geoponica reports the process as a proven and obvious fact:
If any further evidence is necessary to enhance the faith in things already proved, you may behold that carcases, decaying from the effect of time and tepid moisture, change into small animals. Go, and bury slaughtered oxen -- the fact is known from experience -- the rotten entrails produce flower-sucking bees, who, like their parents, roam over pastures, bent upon work, and hopeful of the future. A buried war-horse produces the hornet.

Scepticism
Pre-dating Nicander by a century, Aristotle never mentions bugonia and dismisses generation of bees from other animals. Furthermore, he is able to distinguish the castes of drone, worker, and "king" so he would certainly have been able to distinguish bees from their mimics. Later authors mention bugonia in commentaries on Aristotle's Physics. Archelaus calls bees the "factitious progeny of a decaying ox". Celsus and Columella are recorded as having opposed the practice.

Later sources

Pietro de' Crescenzi refers to Bugonia circa 1304. In 1475, Konrad of Megenberg, in the first German book of natural history, claimed that the bees are born from the skin and the stomach of an ox. Michael Herren gives a detailed description of bugonia drawn from Geoponica. Johannes Colerus whose book constituted the book of reference for many generations of apiarists expresses the same belief in bugonia. The method appears even in European apiculture books of the 1700s.

In Abrahamic religions
A similar story of the creation of bees is seen in the Book of Judges, where Samson puts forward the riddle of "out of the strong came forth sweetness," referring to a swarm of bees found inside a dead lion.

The bugonia belief is also reported in the Jerusalem Talmud and the Babylonian Talmud.

Philo offers this origin of bees as a possible reason why honey is forbidden as a sacrifice to Yahweh.

Origin of the belief

One explanation claims that any of the numerous Batesian mimics of bees with scavenger larvae were mistaken for bees ("footless at first, anon with feet and wings"). More specifically, the hoverfly Eristalis tenax has received particular attention. While not providing honey, these flies would have been productive pollinators.

Others argue that beekeepers would have understood that flies do not produce honey and give the explanation that Apis mellifera (western honey bee) resorts to any cavity, and in particular cavities of trees and rocks, but also in skulls and in thoracic cavities of large animal carcasses in which to construct a nest. There is one, possibly apocryphal, attestation of actual usage of a man's skull by wasps.

In popular culture

The story of Samson and the bees is celebrated on tins of Tate & Lyle golden syrup.

William Shakespeare knew of bugonia as he says in Henry IV: "Tis seldom when the bee doth leave her comb, in the dead carrion".

See also

 Aristaeus
 Bee (mythology)
 Bull (mythology)
 Bucranium
 Georgics

References

Further reading
 
Luciano Landolfi, Ovidio, Aristeo e i "ritocchi" della bugonia
 

Origin of life